Shi Hongwei (born December 1972) is a Chinese diplomat who is the current Chinese Ambassador to Syria, in office since January 2023.

Career

On 29 January 2023, he succeeded  as Chinese Ambassador to Syria.

References

1972 births
Living people
Ambassadors of China to Syria